A "National Plan of Action for Children" (NPA) is a national report in follow-up to the 2002 Special Session on Children of the UN General Assembly in New York. Many countries have been developing their own NPAs since 2002.

External links
UNICEF - "Convention on the Right of Children"
List of the different NPA's worldwide

References
 
 
 

Children's rights instruments
United Nations reports
2002 documents
2002 in international relations
Action plans